Janusz Cegliński (born 6 April 1949) is a Polish former basketball player. He competed in the men's tournament at the 1972 Summer Olympics.

References

1949 births
Living people
Polish men's basketball players
Olympic basketball players of Poland
Basketball players at the 1972 Summer Olympics
Sportspeople from Gdańsk